Polychrus femoralis, or Werner's bush anole, is a species of anole native to Ecuador and Peru. It can be found in forests and shrublands.

References

Polychrotidae
Fauna of Ecuador
Fauna of Peru
Species described in 1910
Taxa named by Franz Werner